Odostomia sapia is a species of sea snail, a marine gastropod mollusk in the family Pyramidellidae, the pyrams and their allies.

Description
The oval shell is semitranslucent. Its length measures 1.8 mm. The whorls of the protoconch are small, deeply obliquely immersed in the first of the succeeding turns, above which only the tilted edge of the last volution projects, which is marked by five slender spiral threads. The four whorls of the teleoconch are amply rounded, slightly constricted at the sutures and appressed at the summits. They are marked by six spiral cords between the sutures, of which the second and third below the summit are very narrow, occupying together about as much space as one of the other cords. These cords are separated by grooves which almost equal them. The axial sculpture is reduced to feeble indications of ribs which are best shown near the summit of the whorls, where they render the spiral keels feebly nodulous. About twenty-two of these ribs appear upon the penultimate whorl. The periphery and the base of the body whorl is well rounded. It is marked by seven spiral keels, which grow successively weaker from the periphery to the umbilical area. The channels separating the cords are narrow, well incised, crossed by numerous slender axial threads. The large aperture is broadly ovate. The posterior angle is acute. The outer lip is thin. The columella is moderately strong, curved, slightly reflected. The parietal wall is glazed with a thin callus.

Distribution
This species occurs in the Pacific Ocean off San Diego, California.

References

External links
 To ITIS: Odostomia sapia

sapia
Gastropods described in 1909